Frederick Beck (27 January 1883 – 26 February 1972) was a British wrestler who competed in the 1908 Summer Olympics. In 1908 he won the bronze medal in the freestyle wrestling middleweight class.

References

External links
 

1883 births
1972 deaths
Olympic wrestlers of Great Britain
Wrestlers at the 1908 Summer Olympics
British male sport wrestlers
Olympic bronze medallists for Great Britain
Olympic medalists in wrestling
Medalists at the 1908 Summer Olympics